La Caravelle is a restaurant and jazz venue in Marseille, France, situated on the first floor of the Hotel Belle Vue.

References

Jazz clubs in France
Restaurants in Marseille